Margarites mirabilis is a species of sea snail, a marine gastropod mollusk in the family Margaritidae.

Description
The height of the shell attains 13.3 mm.

Distribution
This species occurs in the Atlantic Ocean off Brazil at depths between 85 m and 90 m.

References

mirabilis
Gastropods described in 2006